The protected cruiser Blanco Encalada was purchased by the Chilean Government for £333,500 during the Argentine–Chilean naval arms race. She was the second ship named Blanco Encalada. (The previous ship was the armored frigate Blanco Encalada sunk in the 1891 Chilean Civil War).

In December 1906 she was involved in the repression of the workers movement in the Saltpeter mines, railroads and harbour in Antofagasta.
 
On 17 December 1907 she brought troops from Arica to Iquique to repress thousands of miners from different nitrate mines in Chile's north to appeal for government intervention to improve their living and working conditions. These troops committed the Santa María School massacre.

See also
 South American dreadnought race

References

Cruisers of the Chilean Navy
1893 ships
Ships built by Armstrong Whitworth
Ships built on the River Tyne